Mattias Eriksson Falk (born 1990) is a Swedish politician of the Sweden Democrats party who has been a Member of the Riksdag since 2022 representing Södermanland County.

Falk was grew up in Bomhus and worked as a bus driver after leaving school. He was elected as a county councilor for the Sweden Democrats in Gävleborg and was appointed regional chairman and group leader of the SD in Gävleborg in 2019, holding the post until his election to the Riksdag in 2022. In the Riksdag, Falk sits on the committees for finance and the labour market. He takes parliamentary seat 117.

References 

Living people
1990 births
21st-century Swedish politicians
Members of the Riksdag 2022–2026
Members of the Riksdag from the Sweden Democrats
People from Gävle Municipality